The women's 52 kg competition at the 2020 European Judo Championships was held on 19 November at the O2 Arena.

Results

Final

Repechage

Top half

Bottom half

References

External links
 

W52
European Judo Championships Women's Half Lightweight
European W52